The University of Public Service (UPS) is a higher educational institution in Budapest, Hungary. Established in 2012, it is one of the youngest universities in Central and Eastern Europe; however, its faculties as former independent colleges look back much earlier.

The university was officially founded on 1 January 2012 through the merger of the Zrínyi Miklós National Defence University (becoming the Faculty of Military Sciences and Officer Training), the Police College (becoming the Faculty of Law Enforcement) and the Faculty of Public Administration of Corvinus University of Budapest (becoming the Faculty of Public Administration at UPS). In addition to these faculties, UPS includes institutions that function as educational organs and think tanks and is initiating its fourth faculty of European and international studies.

The university's primary goal is to educate future public administration officials, military and law enforcement officers (through BA and MA programmes) and to develop the skills and know-how of current members of public service (through further training programmes). Moreover, UPS also functions as a think tank for public service (through PhD programmes, joint conferences, and individual research activities of lecturers).

History
While modern Hungarian higher education has always included programmes focusing on the education and training of people primarily preparing for public service, Ludovika - UPS is the first university in the country exclusively dealing with the formation of future public servants.

The University of Public Service was officially established on 1 January 2012 through the merger of three separate higher educational institutions: the Zrínyi Miklós National Defence University, the Police College and the Faculty of Public Administration of Corvinus University of Budapest. In 2017, the water and environmental institutes of the József Eötvös College merged into the university.

Accordingly, these institutions became the Faculty of Military Sciences and Officer Training, the Faculty of Law Enforcement, the Faculty of Public Governance and International Studies and the Faculty of Water Sciences respectively.

Principles of establishment

The merger of the three higher educational institutions, focusing on military officer, law enforcement officer and public administration official training respectively, was directed by the aim of establishing a university where all main branches of public service training are present. This reflects a comprehensive approach which enables the efficient and effective cooperation of future servicemen in these respective branches. In addition to the students' understanding of each other's field of expertise and service, the concept includes the opportunity for mobility (cross-career paths) in civil, military, and law enforcement services.

Predecessors and heritage
Although UPS was officially established on 1 January 2012, through their merger the Zrínyi Miklós National Defence University, the Police College and the Faculty of Public Administration of Corvinus University of Budapest became the legal predecessors of UPS.

The Zrínyi Miklós National Defence University was officially established in 1996, but it had several predecessors dating back to the early nineteenth century. The most notable is the Royal Hungarian Ludovika Academy which was established on 8 November 1808. The academy was not only the first Hungarian military higher educational institution but was acknowledged to be on an equal level as the Theresian Military Academy in Austria in 1897 making the Ludovika Academy an internationally renowned centre for military sciences and officer training.

Regarding the training of law enforcement officers and public administration officials, the predecessors of Ludovika - UPS have been present in Hungarian higher education for 40 years with the Police College being founded in 1970 and the College of Public Administration established in 1977 (and functioning as the Faculty of Public Administration at the Corvinus University of Budapest after 2005).

The efforts of UPS in building on this legacy include the university's return to the Ludovika Campus that used to give home to the Royal Hungarian Ludovika Academy.

The Ludovika Project
Since Ludovika - UPS was established through the merger of three separate higher educational institutions, the university has started its operation on three different campuses at once. The integration of the faculties includes their inclusion in one single campus.

Following the traditions in Hungarian public service training, the headquarters of UPS is the Ludovika Campus: in May 2012 the Hungarian government decided to renovate the main building of the Ludovika Academy and the nearby Orczy Park thus establishing the central campus for Ludovika - UPS. The renewal of the main campus building was realized following a dual directive: the building was to be modern yet preserving its heritage. Accordingly, the campus centre was equipped with up-to-date technology and infrastructure while keeping its original trademarks in a neo-classicist style. The Orczy Park and its surroundings provide altogether an area of 73,700 square metres (18.2 acres) for the new campus.

Organisation and operation

Management
The management of the university is led by the rector who is supported by vice-rectors with separate portfolios: the vice rector for science, the vice-rector for education, the vice-rector for development, and the vice-rector for international affairs. In addition, the internal administrative and financial issues are managed by the secretary-general and the chief financial director, respectively.

Faculties
The University of Public Service operates with four faculties: the Faculty of Military Sciences and Officer Training, the Faculty of Law Enforcement, the Faculty of Public Governance and International Studies and the Faculty of Water Sciences.

Faculty of Military Sciences and Officer Training
The Faculty of Military Sciences and Officer Training educates professional military officers in the fields of infantry, armour, artillery, reconnaissance, maintenance, logistics, military engineering, signalling, nuclear, biological chemical defence, and air defence. Besides gaining the highest standard of professional education, cadets learn about proper military traditions and get familiar with the commitments required to become able to deal with the complex challenges of the unfolding century. The university is the only one in Hungary entitled to provide BSc, MSc, and PhD degrees in military sciences and military engineering, and to educate military officers. Owing to the special nature of this profession, education is tailored according to the needs of the Ministry of Defence and the Hungarian Defence Forces.

The faculty is also responsible for educating civil experts for the national and international defence spheres in the fields of defence C3 systems management, radicalism and religious extremism, and security and defence policy. Graduates are guaranteed a job in the defence sector or other sectors of the state administration, but many of them make an international career in notable international organisations, such as the NATO and the EU. The highest level of further education is also incorporated in the Faculty – graduates of the so-called General Staff Training Centre regularly coat high positions in the Hungarian Defence Forces.

The faculty's main Campus, the Miklós Zrínyi Barracks and University Campus (1101 Budapest, Hungária körút 9-11) is located near downtown Budapest. Seminar rooms, special language labs, a library with more than 500 thousand books, sport facilities, a restaurant and a buffet are all at the disposal of the cadets and students. The department of Air Force of the faculty is located in Szolnok.

Two out of the four Doctoral Schools of the university belong to the faculty. The Doctoral School of Military Science (established in 1996) and Doctoral School of Military Engineering (established in 2002) guarantee that lecturers and researchers of the faculty can initiate and carry out grandiose research projects, often in the form of international consortia. The Doctoral School of Military Sciences focuses on the questions of military science regarding the activities of the defence sphere. This includes a wide spectrum of research fields from military history through security theories, defence administration to national security. The Doctoral School of  Military Engineering include all disciplines of technical, disciplinary, technological, technology transfer and technical innovations related to the military application of all other engineering disciplines belonging to engineering sciences.

Faculty of Law Enforcement
Similarly to the Faculty of Military Sciences and Officer Training, the Faculty of Law Enforcement has the exclusive task of training future law enforcement officers in Hungary. In accordance, the faculty's graduates can begin their career as police officers or public officials of related organizations, including the Hungarian Police Force, the National Tax and Customs Administration, the Hungarian Prison Service, the National Directorate-General for Disaster Management and the Office of Immigration and Nationality. However, the knowledge and know-how acquired through the trainings can be applied in the private security sector as well.

The Faculty of Law Enforcement provides the following degree programmes:
 Criminal Administration BA
 Law Enforcement Administration BA
 Law Enforcement MA

Established in 2015 the Doctoral School of Law Enforcement is currently the single doctoral school in Hungary explicitly focusing on research issues of law enforcement. In addition to the other faculties, institutes and organisational bodies of UPS, the Doctoral School intends to involve scholars from external partners (international partners, universities, and research institutes) in order to enhance the research programmes in law enforcement. The Doctoral School offers several formats of education, hence PhD students have the choice of full time (scholarship or self-financed) studies, part-time (self-financed) studies and individual training (self-financed) or individual preparation.

Research topics of the doctoral school:

 law enforcement theory, history of law enforcement, national security and law enforcement
 specialized fields of law enforcement, the international and European Union law and policy aspects of law enforcement
 the legal, criminological, forensic and social sciences aspects of law enforcement

Faculty of Public Governance and International Studies 
After several changes in its history and name, the Faculty of Public Governance and International Studies is now one of the four faculties of the University of Public Service. The faculty provides a vibrant community designed to ensure that students at undergraduate level acquire highly developed professional skills, while they also learn the basics of political and legal sciences and classical international relations and diplomacy from practitioners. The faculty aims at educating professional civil servants for all levels of state administration as its predecessor has done so since 1977. 

The core task of the Faculty of Public Governance and International Studies Faculty of Public Administration is to provide professionals for the administration at the central and local government level in Hungary on the one hand and to prepare students for public service on an international level and in Hungarian diplomacy on the other. The faculty's objective is to train high-performing professionals with the necessary knowledge and skills to engage successfully in the job market for civil service both national and international, including EU institutions the diplomatic service or military administration. 

The faculty is located in the modern Educational Centre and also in the renovated historic building of the Ludovika Academy – the core of the university's central Ludovika Campus. The campus offers up-to-date teaching facilities within a green recreational zone of the city.

The faculty operates its PhD programmes since 2013. The Doctoral School for Public Administration Studies is Hungary's first and only doctoral school with this profile, enhancing doctoral students' academic advancement. The research curriculum encompasses inter alia sociology, public management, economics, governance studies, international and European studies.

Faculty of Water Sciences 
The Faculty of Water Sciences is the youngest faculty of the University of Public Service, beginning its operation in the Southern Hungarian city called Baja on 1 February 2017. 

The educational building of the faculty is located in one of the areas of Baja, where the university provides training on modern water management procedures in its facilities and laboratories. The faculty has two measuring stations, one in the Eastern Mecsek area, one in Érsekcsanád, which both serve as field training facilities. Ludovika - UPS provides modern technology and measuring instruments that students can use to acquire practical knowledge. 

In the Civil Engineering and Environmental Engineering degree programmes of UPS, students are trained to answer the greatest environmental and social challenges of the 21st century and to handle the problems of water shortage and water management.

The Faculty of Water Sciences provides the following degree courses:
 Civil Engineering (Bsc, in English)
 Regional Water Management Specialisation
 Water Supply and Wastewater Treatment Specialisation
 Environmental Engineering (Bsc, in English)
 Water Management Specialization
 Water Treatment - Wastewater Treatment Specialization
 International Water Governance and Diplomacy (Msc, In English)

Institutes

József Eötvös Research Centre 
In addition to its faculties, the university's activities in education, training, and research are realized by its research institutes. Due to the university's crucial role in HR development for national public service, these institutes are in co-operation with their respective partners within Hungarian public service.

The Eötvös József Research Centre (EJRC) is the university's focal point for strategic research activities. The Centre comprises several thematic research institutes. 

The Eötvös József Research Centre of the University of Public Service was established on 1 February 2019. The EJRC is an academic organizational body of the university and is responsible for organizing strategic level research in a centralized manner and for operating research institutes.

Institute of Executive Training and Continuing Education in Public Administration 
Activities in this field are managed by the Institute of Executive Training and Continuing Education, connected directly to the Vice-Rector for International Affairs.

Institute of Disaster Management
The Institute of Disaster Management operates under the supervision of the Ministry of Interior and the National Directorate-General for Disaster Management.

Institute for Strategic Studies 
The Institute for Strategic Studies (ISS) was established in 1992. As a consequence of continued transformation of the wider institutional framework, ISS has been functioning in various arrangements under the Hungarian Ministry of Defense, then from 2007 under the National Defense University, and finally from 1 January 2012 under the University of Public Service (UPS).

The Institute’s primary activity is conducting research and analysis of security and defense related issues. However, important fields of ISS activities are public outreach and media activities, 'security marketing' in other words. ISS staff is involved in education as well, giving lectures and delivering courses in their respective fields of research in various universities at all levels of higher education, BA – MA – PhD.

Publications
The university publishes the following journals:
 AARMS – Academic and Applied Research in Military and Public Management Science
 Acta Humana – Emberi Jogi Közlemények
 Európai Tükör
 Hadmérnök
 Hadtudományi Szemle
 Magyar Rendészet
 Műszaki Katonai Közlöny
 Nemzet és Biztonság – Biztonságpolitikai Szemle
 Nemzetbiztonsági Szemle
 Pro Publico Bono – Magyar Közigazgatás
 Public Governance, Administration and Finances Law Review
 Repüléstudományi Közlemények
Discontinued titles include:
 Államtudományi Műhelytanulmányok
 Bolyai Szemle

International outreach
Today the university is home of numerous international conferences, workshops, summer schools and other events on a regular basis and takes part in numerous student and lecturer mobility programmes. While UPS graduates primarily begin their career in national public service, this also includes career paths with international aspects.

Memberships and partner institutions
Ludovika-UPS is a member of several international organisations dealing with public administration and law enforcement education, such as the European Institute of Public Administration (EIPA), the Networks of Institutes and Schools of Public Administration in Central and Eastern Europe (NISPAcee), the Association of European Police Colleges (AEPC), the European Police College (CEPOL), the European Security and Defence College (ESDC). Furthermore, Ludovika-UPS has relations with the NATO Defence College (NDC) and the George C. Marshall European Center for Security Studies (GCMC). As a higher educational institution UPS has many bilateral relations with other European universities with their cooperation primarily focusing on the mobility of students and lecturers. UPS has bilateral agreements with numerous higher education institutions. The university is the partner of College of Law in Wroclaw. On the basis of this cooperation, students can take part in the Erasmus+ program

Hungarian Academy of Diplomacy 
Ludovika - UPS in cooperation with the Ministry of Foreign Affairs and Trade of Hungary established the Hungarian Academy of Diplomacy to launch its first cycle of studies in the fall of 2020.

The Hungarian Academy of Diplomacy provides for those who plan to develop their career within the Hungarian diplomatic corps and intend to represent Hungarian national and economic interest in the world. The objective of the programme is to train future officials of the Ministry of Foreign Affairs and Trade of Hungary. The Ludovika Campus provides the venue for the one-year course, which puts emphasis on language and practical skills development as well.

College of Visegrad+

Student life

Communities
Students at Ludovika-UPS organize their own respective societies of which the Special Student Societies receive particular attention due to their mission of organizing both open scientific events and leisure activities. These societies are located at each faculty of Ludovika-UPS and have their own set of focus with the Special Student Society for Security Policy dealing with contemporary issues of foreign and security policy, the Ostrakon Special Student Society focusing on governance and management, the Magyary Zoltán Special Student Society dealing with public administration related issues and the Szent György Special Student Society including students interested in law enforcement studies.

Student organisations also offer opportunities for additional academic efforts and research. There are several special student societies operating as groups of socially sensitive intellectuals who are devoted to their (and their fellow students') talent management. These societies are found in all faculties of UPS and are open to students with a strong commitment to acquire deeper knowledge. Another form of intellectual self-development is the participation in the so-called scientific students' associations. In essence, these societies provide a forum for talented students to publish and present their scientific/academic works thereby aiding them in their first steps towards PhD studies.

Due to the work of the Erasmus Student Network (ESN), international students are always invited to events and parties organised by the various student organisations while the International Office invites international students to all relevant conferences and scientific programmes in English. One of the university's most popular series of events is the Ludovika Ambassadors' Forum where ambassadors accredited to Hungary share their thoughts about current issues of international affairs related to Hungary and to their respective country.

Representing students' interests is also very important for UPS. The Students' Union helps students in this respect and actively participates in the work of every important decision-making body of Ludovika - UPS. A similar role is allocated to the Doctoral Students' Union, as it represents all PhD students of the university. These organizations also offer a wide range of events for students.

Main events
Students, lecturers, and administrative staff of Ludovika-UPS can participate at several official events organized regularly throughout the academic year. For students, the first major events are the Freshman Camp offering an opportunity for first year students to meet each other in a friendly environment with several joint activities and concerts, and the Students' Ball where the symbolic inauguration of first year students is held. At the end of the academic year, official events are held where students can socialize with their professors. These usually take form of a ball organized by the special student communities and the related institutes or departments.

Since November is considered as the month of science at UPS, the university organizes an official ball to which students, professors and members of the administrative staff are both welcome. This event is harmonized with the Hungarian Science Festival which is a nationwide set of programmes: universities have open lectures to the public and young researchers and PhD students can give presentations on their respective research topics and results.

Bachelor and Master level students with potential for additional research can participate at conferences where they can present their respective papers which they prepared with the guidance of professors. These conferences are organized by the faculties' scientific students’ associations separately on the faculty level after which a similar conference is held on the university level. This is synchronized with the organization of the National Conference of Scientific Students’ Associations held biannually. These events offer great opportunities for those BA and MA level students who wish to publish their research results and have the intention of continuing their studies on a PhD level in the future.

The university offers several recreational programmes, from which the largest one is the University Sports Day when students, lecturers and members of the administrative staff can participate at various physical activities. Similarly, the Faculty Days and Dormitory Days offer sporting activities as well, however, these events last 2–3 days with each day having a different theme.

References

National University of Public Service
Educational institutions established in 2012
2012 establishments in Hungary
Universities and colleges formed by merger in Hungary